Al Williams (born August 2, 1947) is an American politician. He is a member of the Georgia House of Representatives from the 168th District, serving since 2002. He is a member of the Democratic Party.

References

Living people
Democratic Party members of the Georgia House of Representatives
1947 births
People from Liberty County, Georgia
21st-century American politicians